The East African little collared fruit bat (Myonycteris relicta) is a species of megabat in the family Pteropodidae. It is found in Kenya, Tanzania, and Zimbabwe. Its natural habitats are subtropical or tropical dry forests and moist savanna.

Sources

Myonycteris
Taxonomy articles created by Polbot
Mammals described in 1980
Bats of Africa